Doris Jones is a former member of the Ohio House of Representatives.

External links
Profile on the Ohio Ladies Gallery website

References

Living people
Women state legislators in Ohio
Members of the Ohio House of Representatives
Year of birth missing (living people)
21st-century American women